Tante is the French, Dutch (Nederland), German, Danish, and Yiddish word for aunt (female sibling of a parent)

Tante may also refer to:

 A novel by Anne Douglas Sedgwick, upon which the film The Impossible Woman is based
 Tante Leen (1912–1992), Dutch folk singer
 Tante Rose, a racehorse
 Tante Sidonia, a character from the Belgian comics series Suske en Wiske
 Tante Koosje, a restaurant located in Loenen aan de Vecht in the Netherlands
 Tante Marie, a cookery school in Woking, Surrey, England
 La Tante DC10 Restaurant, Accra, Ghana; a restaurant built into a green DC-10 former airliner
 La Tante River, Grenada; a river on the island of Grenada

See also
 Upper La Tante, Saint David, Grenada; a town
 La grand'tante (The Great-Aunt), an 1867 comic opera